Joseph Kraeutler (born November 21, 1977) is the former head of the Photographs Department at Phillips de Pury & Company. Kraeutler is a graduate of Elmira College.

References
 http://tmagazine.blogs.nytimes.com/tag/joseph-kraeutler/
 http://www.nyartbeat.com/nyablog/2010/05/staged-and-startled-an-interview-with-joseph-kraeutler/
 https://www.nytimes.com/2011/08/05/arts/design/dont-quit-your-day-job-at-hasted-kraeutler-review.html
 http://watermillcenter.org/benefit/auction
 https://web.archive.org/web/20120602233011/http://magazine.saatchionline.com/culture/reports-from/liechtenstein/hunter_and_hunted_at_sara_tecc_1
 https://web.archive.org/web/20120425225841/http://68.168.223.193/media/48553/photo_7_20_07.pdf
 https://web.archive.org/web/20120516220248/http://www.aperture.org/exposures/?tag=exhibition
 http://www.nysun.com/arts/point-click-sell/74268/

External links 

 Joseph Kraeutler Bankruptcy 2022

  Joseph Kraeutler Bankruptcy 2021

Art museums and galleries in New York City
1977 births
Living people